The Roman Catholic Archdiocese of Tlalnepantla is  a Metropolitan Archdiocese in Mexico. Based in Tlalnepantla, México state, its suffragan dioceses include Cuautitlán, Ecatepec, Izcalli, Netzahualcóyotl, Teotihuacan, Texcoco, and Valle de Chalco.

Bishops

Ordinaries
Felipe de Jesús Cueto González, O.F.M. (1964–1979) 
Adolfo Antonio Suárez Rivera (1980–1983), appointed Archbishop of Monterrey, Nuevo León (Cardinal in 1994)
Manuel Pérez-Gil y González (1984–1996) 
Ricardo Guízar Díaz (1996–2009)
Carlos Aguiar Retes (2009–2017), elevated to Cardinal in 2016; appointed Archbishop of México, Federal District
José Antonio Fernández Hurtado (2019–

Auxiliary bishops
Francisco Ramírez Navarro (2000–2015)
Efraín Mendoza Cruz (2011–
Jorge Cuapio Bautista (2015–

See also
List of Roman Catholic archdioceses in México

External links and references

Roman Catholic dioceses in Mexico
Roman Catholic ecclesiastical provinces in Mexico
 
Christian organizations established in 1964
Roman Catholic dioceses and prelatures established in the 20th century
Tlalnepantla de Baz